The Aquila Legis (.L.F.) is a Filipino fraternity based in the Ateneo de Manila School of Law. Founded by Joaquin Misa, the first bossman or "Honorable Praeses" in 1949, it was the first fraternity founded by students, and the first fraternity in the Philippines using Latin nomenclature, preceding a number of Philippine law-based fraternities with names derived from Latin. (Aquila Legis in English means "eagle of the law," but is commonly translated as "legal eagle.")

Over the past six decades, the fraternity has inducted over 1,500 members, some of whom eventually rose to public prominence as cabinet secretaries, legislators, justices, and ambassadors.

History 

Aquila Legis Fraternity was founded as Fraternitas Aquilae Legis in 1949 by 21 second- and third-year students of the Ateneo Law School. As expressed by Aquila Legis alumnus and former Press Secretary Ignacio Bunye, the fraternity was created "to promote camaraderie" and to "nurture Catholic lawyers and to produce leaders in every field of human endeavor", in line with the aims of the Jesuit-run Ateneo Law School.

Among the early members were Gabriel Singson (later governor of the Bangko Sentral ng Pilipinas, or BSP), Teofisto Guingona, Jr. of the second batch in 1950 (later Vice President of the Philippines), and Raul Boncan (later a member of the BSP's Monetary Board).

Over the years, the fraternity has earned a reputation for helping members pass the bar examinations, often with flying colors. Throughout Aquila Legis' history, over 40 fraternity alumni have reached the Top Ten of the Bar Examinations, five of whom earned first place. While one member obtained an "Excellent" mark in the 2020/2021 Bar Examinations.

For a list of the fraternity's bar topnotchers, see: Bar Topnotchers and Placers from Aquila Legis.

Controversy 
On February 8, 9 and 10, 1991, Aquila Legis senior members conducted initiation rites for neophytes interested in joining the fraternity's ranks. As a result of the traditional hazing ritual, one of the neophytes, Leonardo "Lenny" Villa, died from serious physical injuries at the Chinese General Hospital on February 10, 1991.

In the wake of Villa's death, charges were filed against 26 members of the fraternity. The Regional Trial Court of Caloocan found the defendants guilty of the crime charged.  The Court of Appeals however, overturned the findings of the trial court and acquitted 19 of the 26 defendants. The conviction of two Aquila Legis fraternity members, Fidelito Dizon and Artemio Villareal, was upheld, while the sentences for four other fraternity members were "downgraded from homicide to slight physical injuries". The Supreme Court later elevated the charges for the four to reckless imprudence resulting in homicide, downgrading Dizon's charges to the same. Villareal died in 2011 while awaiting appeal.

As a result of the controversy surrounding the death of Lenny Villa, Republic Act No. 8049 (more popularly known as the "Anti-Hazing Law") was passed into law in 1995. Up to today, the Lenny Villa case is considered as the first case that depicted the fraternity violence that occurs during initiation rites.

Notable alumni

Bienvenido Laguesma, Secretary of the Department of Labor and Employment
Mariano del Castillo, Associate Justice of the Supreme Court of the Philippines
Teofisto Guingona, Jr., Vice President of the Philippines under President Gloria Macapagal Arroyo
Ernesto Maceda, Jr., former Senator and President of the Senate of the Philippines
Jose Calida, Solicitor General under President Duterte
Silvestre Bello III, Secretary of Labor and Employment and former Solicitor General
Gabriel Singson, Governor of the Bangko Sentral ng Pilipinas
Ignacio Bunye, Presidential Spokesman under President Arroyo
Sergio Apostol, former Chief Presidential Legal Counsel
Ricardo Puno Jr., Press Secretary under President Joseph Estrada
Neptali M. Gonzales, Jr., Former Mayor of Mandaluyong
Felixberto Urbiztondo, Mayor of Barobo Surigao del Sur
Meynardo A. Sabili, Mayor of Lipa City
Francis Tolentino, Senator
Prospero Nograles, former House Speaker
Arleigh Jay C. Sitoy, former Mayor of Cordova, Cebu

References

External links
Aquila Legis Fraternity's official website (members only)

Legal fraternities and sororities in the Philippines
Student organizations established in 1949
1949 establishments in the Philippines